Ferdinand Feyerick (27 January 1865 – 12 September 1920) was a Belgian fencer. He won a bronze medal in the team épée event at the 1908 Summer Olympics.

References

External links
 

1865 births
1920 deaths
Belgian male épée fencers
Olympic fencers of Belgium
Fencers at the 1908 Summer Olympics
Olympic bronze medalists for Belgium
Olympic medalists in fencing
Sportspeople from Ghent
Medalists at the 1908 Summer Olympics
20th-century Belgian people